Jessica Rowley Pell Bird Blakemore is an American novelist. Under her maiden name, Jessica Bird, she writes contemporary romance novels, and as J.R. Ward, she writes paranormal romance. She is a three-time winner of the Romance Writers of America RITA Award, once as Bird for Best Short Contemporary Romance for From the First and twice as Ward for Best Paranormal Romance for Lover Revealed and Dearest Ivie, and her books have been on The New York Times Best Seller list.

Biography
Born Jessica Rowley Pell Bird in Massachusetts, United States, she is the daughter of W. Gillette Bird Jr. and Maxine F. Bird.  She began writing as a child, penning her thoughts in diaries as well as inventing short stories. The summer before she went to college she wrote her first book, a romance novel. After that, she wrote regularly, but for herself.  Bird attended Smith College where she double majored in history and art history, concentrating on the medieval period.  She then received a Juris Doctor degree from Albany Law School and worked in healthcare administration for several years, including as the Chief of Staff at Beth Israel Deaconess Medical Center in Boston, Massachusetts.

In 2001, Bird married John Neville Blakemore III.  Her new husband encouraged her to try to get an agent and market her manuscripts. She found an agent, and in 2002 her first novel, a contemporary romance called Leaping Hearts, was published.  Several years later, Bird invented a world populated by vampires and began writing single-title paranormal romance novels under the pen name J.R. Ward. These novels are a series, known as the Black Dagger Brotherhood.

Bird likes to write series novels which incorporate characters from her previous books. She likens the process of creating a series to "meeting friends through other friends".  Her heroes are most often alpha males, "the tougher, the cockier, the more arrogant, the better", while the heroines are smart and strong.

The Romance Writers of America awarded her the RITA Award for Best Short Contemporary Romance in 2007 for her novel From the First.  She has also been nominated six times for Romantic Times Reviewer's Choice Awards, winning once for Lover Awakened. She was also number 2 on the New York Times Bestsellers List of 2014.

As Jessica Bird

Single novels

The Moorehouse Legacy Series

The O'Banyon Brothers Series

Omnibus

Collections in collaboration
 "Plain Jane's Secret Life / Beauty and the Black Sheep" (2005) (with Cathy Gillen Thacker)
 "The Billionaire Next Door" in Mistress: Taken by the Tycoon (2009) (with Jan Colley and Kristi Gold)

As J. R. Ward

Black Dagger Brotherhood Universe

The Black Dagger Brotherhood 
 
 
 
 
 
 
 
 
 
 
 
 
 
 
 
 
 
 
 
 Lover Arisen. Gallery Books. April 5, 2022

Christmas Novels

Novellas 
 "Father Mine: Zsadist and Bella's Story" (October 2008) – ebook
 "The Story of Son" (in Dead After Dark anthology) (December 2008)
 "Dearest Ivie" (March 2018) - ebook
 "Prisoner of Night" (January 2019) - ebook

Supplement

Omnibus 
 Black Dagger Brotherhood, box set: Dark Lover, Lover Eternal, Lover Awakened, Lover Unbound, Lover Revealed, Lover Enshrined (2009)

Fallen Angels Series
Same universe but takes place in an earlier timeline.

 
 1

Black Dagger Legacy
Spin-off series that details the trainees.

Black Dagger Brotherhood: Prison Camp 

 The Jackal. Gallery Books. August 2020 [2020]. .
 The Wolf. Gallery Books. November 16, 2021 [2021]. 
 “The Viper.” Gallery Books. September 20, 2022

Lair of the Wolven

 Claimed. Pocket Books. June 29, 2021 [2021]. .

The Bourbon Kings

Firefighters

Novella
"The Wedding from Hell" (3-Part ebook prequel for Consumed)-July–August 2018

Collections in collaboration
 "The Story of Son" in Dead After Dark (2008) (with Sherrilyn Kenyon, Susan Squires, Dianna Love)
 "Dark Lover" in Blood Lust 6 (2010) (with MaryJanice Davidson, Christine Feehan)
 "Lover Awakened" in Blood Sample 7 (2010) (with MaryJanice Davidson, Laurell K Hamilton, Charlaine Harris, Katie MacAlister)

Awards and reception

 2006 - RT Book Reviews Reviewers Choice Award for Best Vampire Romance for Lover Awakened
 2006 - RT Book Reviews Reviewers Choice Award for Best Vampire Romance for Lover Unbound
 2007 - Romance Writers of America RITA Award for Best Short Contemporary Romance for From the First
 2008 - P.E.A.R.L. (Paranormal Excellence Award for Romantic Literature) for Best Vampire Romance for Lover Enshrined
 2008 - Romance Writers of America RITA Award for Best Paranormal Romance for Lover Revealed
 2009 - P.E.A.R.L. (Paranormal Excellence Award for Romantic Literature) for Best Overall Paranormal Romance AND Best Vampire Romance for Lover Avenged
 2010 - Goodreads Choice Award Winner for Best Romance for Lover Mine
 2011 - Goodreads Choice Award Winner for Best Romance for Lover Unleashed
 2011 - RT Book Reviews Reviewers Choice Award for Best Vampire Romance for Lover Unleashed
 2013 - Goodreads Choice Award Winner for Best Romance for Lover at Last

References

External links
 Jessica Bird Official site
 J. R. Ward's Official Site
 BookPage interview with JR Ward

21st-century American novelists
American fantasy writers
American romantic fiction writers
American women short story writers
American women novelists
Living people
RITA Award winners
Smith College alumni
Albany Law School alumni
Novelists from Massachusetts
Women science fiction and fantasy writers
Women romantic fiction writers
21st-century American women writers
21st-century American short story writers
American paranormal romance writers
1969 births